Academy of Geneva may refer to:

University of Geneva, founded by John Calvin in 1559
Rousseau Institute, founded by Édouard Claparède in 1912